Ijäs is a Finnish surname. Notable people with the surname include:

 Janne Ijäs (born 1972), Finnish ice hockey player
 Matti Ijäs (born 1950), Finnish television and film director and screenwriter

Finnish-language surnames